Australoplana also known as Australian flatworm is a genus of land planarians from Australia and New Zealand.

Description
The genus Australoplana is characterized by having an elongated, strap-like body that is broadly convex dorsally and flat ventrally. The creeping sole occupies less than 25% of the body with. The eyes are absent or minute and arranged along the body margins in a single row from the anterior to the posterior end. The parenchymal longitudinal musculature is very weak or absent. The copulatory apparatus has an intra-antral penis papilla in some species and the ovovitelline ducts enter the female atrium ventrally.

Invasive species
Australoplana sanguinea is an invasive alien species in England and Wales where it predates on earthworms.

Etymology
The name Australoplana comes from Latin australis, southern + plana, flat.

Species
The genus Australoplana includes the following species:
Australoplana alba
Australoplana minor (Dendy, 1892)
Australoplana rubicunda (Fletcher & Hamilton, 1888)
Australoplana sanguinea (Moseley, 1877)
Australoplana typhlops (Dendy, 1894)

References

External links
 

Geoplanidae
Rhabditophora genera